Andre Thysse (24 March 1969 – 22 July 2021) was a South African professional super middle/light heavyweight boxer of the 1990s and 2000s.

Biography
He won the Gauteng super middleweight title, South African super middleweight title, and Commonwealth super middleweight title. He was a challenger for the International Boxing Organization (IBO) super middleweight title against Brian Magee, World Boxing Council (WBC) super middleweight title against Markus Beyer, World Boxing Council (WBC) International super middleweight title against Mikkel Kessler, WBC International super middleweight title against Jürgen Brähmer, World Boxing Council (WBC) Continental Americas super middleweight title against Lucian Bute, World Boxing Council (WBC) International light heavyweight title against Adrian Diaconu, and International Boxing Federation (IBF) Australasian super middleweight title against Sakio Bika.

Thysse died on 22 July 2021 at the age of 52 after having contracted COVID-19.

References

External links

Image - Andre Thysse 

British emigrants to South Africa
1969 births
2021 deaths
Light-heavyweight boxers
Super-middleweight boxers
Sportspeople from Germiston
South African male boxers
Deaths from the COVID-19 pandemic in South Africa